Thomas Hunter (September 11, 1834 Baltimore, Maryland – March 11, 1903 Sterling, Cayuga County, New York) was an American businessman and politician from New York.

Life
He attended the common schools, worked on a farm, and then took part in the construction of the Manassas Gap Railroad. From 1857 to 1860, he engaged in the milling business in Sterling Valley. During the American Civil War he enlisted as a private in the 110th New York Volunteers, and finished the war as a captain. After the war he engaged in the lumber business, and then became a railroad contractor.

He was a member of the New York State Assembly (Cayuga Co., 1st D.) in 1881 and 1882.

He was a member of the New York State Senate (26th D.) from 1890 to 1893, sitting in the 113th, 114th, 115th and 116th New York State Legislatures.

Sources
 The New York Red Book compiled by Edgar L. Murlin (published by James B. Lyon, Albany NY, 1897; pg. 403f and 500f)
 Sketches of the Members of the Legislature in The Evening Journal Almanac (1882)
 Obituary Notes; Ex-State Senator THOMAS HUNTER died... in NYT on March 12, 1903

1834 births
1903 deaths
Republican Party New York (state) state senators
People from Sterling, New York
Republican Party members of the New York State Assembly
Union Army officers
Politicians from Baltimore
Businesspeople from Baltimore
19th-century American politicians
19th-century American businesspeople